The Nokia 103 is a mobile phone handset, manufactured by Nokia in Hungary and released for sale in April 2012. It is a basic model phone. As an additional feature this phone has a built in flashlight.

Technical specifications

References

External links
Nokia

103
Mobile phones introduced in 2012